The New Zealand Medical Students' Association Incorporated (NZMSA) is the peak representative body for all medical students in New Zealand. The NZMSA executive is composed of representatives that are elected from Auckland, Wellington, Christchurch and Dunedin medical schools. NZMSA represents medical students on many levels, from universities to government representation.

Membership
Membership is open to students who are enrolled in the Bachelor of Medicine and Bachelor of Surgery (MBChB) degree at either the University of Otago or the University of Auckland in New Zealand.

Presidents

The president is elected annually by the NZMSA Executive and holds the position for one year. Any member is eligible to run for the position of president.

Previous Presidents 
 2001: Richard Pole
 2002: Cindy Towns
 2003: Brandon Adams
 2004: Jess Allen
 2005: Jesse Gale
 2006: Xaviour Walker
 2007: Nick Fancourt
 2008: Anna Dare
 2009: William Perry
 2010: Elizabeth Carr
 2011: Oliver Hansby
 2012: Michael Chen-Xu
 2013: Phillip Chao
 2014: Marise Stuart
 2015: Elizabeth Berryman
 2016: Mike Fleete
 2017: Kieran Bunn
 2018: Jibi Kunnethedam
 2019: Fraser Jeffery
 2020: Ellie Baxter
 2021: Anu Kaw
 2022: Anu Kaw

Awards

NZMSA issues two awards per year to a nominated member of the association. The awards are the NZMSA President's Award for Individual Excellence and the NZMSA Award for Best New Student Initiative.

NZMSA President's Award for Individual Excellence 
This is awarded to "a student who makes an outstanding contribution to the medical student body, recognised for creative problem solving; inspiring their peers and others around them; and their energy and enthusiasm for medicine, education and their community".

Previous Recipients
2010: Sylvia Ross, University of Otago Christchurch School of Medicine
2011: Sudhvir Singh, University of Auckland

NZMSA Award for Best New Student Initiative
This is awarded to "an individual or group of students who have started the most innovative and successful project for that preceding academic year".

Previous Recipients
2010: 11th Edition of the New Zealand Medical Student Journal (NZMSJ)
2011: Trainee Intern Anatomy, University of Otago

Annual conference
Each year, the New Zealand Medical Students' Association holds a conference which brings together medical students from all around the country.

The location of the conference varies from year to year. In 2011, the conference was held in Auckland.

NZMSA Sports Exchange
The annual NZMSA Sports Exchange was established in 2010. Teams from each of the four medical schools in New Zealand compete in a variety of sports.

Previous winners
2010: The University of Otago, Dunedin
2011: The University of Auckland

See also
 Medical school

References

External links
 www.nzmsa.org.nz – New Zealand Medical Students' Association official website

Medical education in New Zealand